Trapped nerve may refer to:
 Compression neuropathy, entrapment of a nerve in the arm or leg
 Compressive radiculopathy, entrapment of a nerve root in the spine (in the neck or back), often caused by a slipped disc